Spearmint is a plant used as a flavouring in food and herbal teas.

Spearmint may also refer to:

Spearmint (flavour), either naturally or artificially created
Wrigley's Spearmint, a brand of chewing gum
Spearmint (band), a British indie band
Spearmint (horse), a racehorse

See also

Spearmint Rhino, a chain of Gentlemen's clubs